Cannabis is a genus of flowering plants with species that have long been used for fibre (hemp), for medicinal purposes, and as a drug. Industrial hemp products are made from cannabis plants selected to produce an abundance of fiber and minimal levels of tetrahydrocannabinol (THC), a psychoactive molecule that produces the "high" associated with cannabis as a drug.

Pre-prohibition
Cannabis  may have been known in Britain as far back as the Bronze Age (ca. 2800 BP) when pieces of textiles and string were found at a site at St. Andrews in Scotland. Microscopic inspection showed that the fibres of these items appeared to have several different characteristics to those of flax.

The first hard evidence of hemp in England are seeds that have been identified as cannabis sativa found in a Roman well in York. Palynologists then find an increasing pollen curve in  sediments, dating from  the early Saxon period and peaking between 800 AD and 1200 AD. Hemp cultivation was widespread and appears to have been concentrated around the coastal areas of Britain which would indicate its importance for making nets, sail-cloth and rope.

However, to satisfy the increased demand for rope and sailcloth for King Henry VIII's new navy, he  decreed (1533)  that all landholders set aside one-quarter acre for the cultivation of flax or hemp for every  sixty acres of land that they tilled in order to provide the necessary fibre. Queen Elizabeth I reintroduced the law (1563 AD) to expand her navy and imposes a £5 fine for any eligible landlord who failed to comply.  From then on the demand increased and the hemp industry became very important to the British economy. Indeed,  it was their need to improve the supply of this strategic raw commodity that come the 1630s the British sped up their colonization of the new world.

Furthermore, cannabis also became an important medicine. There are claims that Queen Victoria took tincture of Cannabis to ease the pain of childbirth but these have been disputed.

Parties

Legislation
In order that Britain could ratify international treaties which it signed up to, it added tincture of cannabis to the list of drugs which already required an importation or exportation licence, granted by the Home Secretary. This took the form of the Dangerous Drugs Act 1920.

Secondary legislation was introduced to ensure better standardization and quality of cannabis tincture. This was achieved by tight legislative control over sourcing the raw materials, processing and distribution. An effect of this control was to restrict the use of tincture to purposes that were strictly medical or scientific. Other forms of cannabis were not affected.

One of the regulations to maintain quality is briefly alluded to by Maud Grieve in her book A Modern Herbal, where she mentions in the section about Indian Hemp that "two-year-old ganja is almost inert, and the law requires it to be burnt in the presence of excise officers."

The League of Nations was put in charge of international drug control after World War One. Cannabis was not initially subject to international control but was controlled as part of the 1925 Geneva Opium Conventions. Control came about due to the local situation in Egypt and the desire of the new leaders of the country to embarrass their former British rulers by claiming that its use had led to widespread insanity. Due to its importance as a medicine and its other industrial uses, this proposal was reduced to prohibiting the unlicensed possession of cannabis.  Britain ratified this agreement by amending the Dangerous Drugs Act 1920 with the  Dangerous Drugs Act 1925 which added some other of cannabis hitherto ignored. Namely, cannabis resin, cannabis oil (hash oil), cannabis leaf, flower-heads and the raw plant itself. However, whole seeds, seed oil (hemp oil) and fibre are not included. They can still be used for baiting fish, feeding birds, cooking, making strong ropes and high quality paper. In order that the government could avoid paying out compensation, enforcement of the act was delayed until 1928, thus giving people time to legitimately dispose of their stock which contravenes the new Bill.

Following the Single Convention on Narcotic Drugs (1961) the cultivation of cannabis ceased in the UK.

Cannabis tincture was finally removed from the British National Formulary in 1971 by the Misuse of Drugs Act 1971.

During prohibition

These are the politicians that have admitted to recreational use following prohibition include, Members of Parliament, Secretaries of State and other Ministers, Peers, and Mayors as well as members of devolved legislatures.

See also

 Cannabis classification in the United Kingdom
 Cannabis in the United Kingdom
 List of United States politicians who have acknowledged cannabis use

References

Politicians
British politicians
Cannabis
People involved in cannabis